Tremar is a hamlet in the parish of St Cleer, Cornwall, England, United Kingdom. It is about 1 km south of Darite and includes Lower Tremar and Venland Cross.

From the early 1960s to the 1980s, it was the home of Tremar Pottery.

Tremar had a popultion of 629 people in 2021.

See also

Tremar Coombe

References

Hamlets in Cornwall